Zelzal-2/Mushak-200 (Persian: زلزال-۲, meaning "Earthquake") is an Iranian unguided long-range artillery rocket. The Zelzal-2 is a 610 mm truck-launched rocket that has a payload of 600 kg and a range of about 200 km. Development of the Zelzal series began in 1990 and the Zelzal-2 was first shown in 1998. It is developed from the Zelzal-1 and was developed into the Zelzal-3. It has been exported to Syria, Hezbollah, and the Houthis, and has seen combat use in the Syrian Civil War and Yemeni Civil War.

The missile is thought to be based on the Soviet 9K52 Luna-M missile.

Operators

 
 
  Hezbollah
  Houthis

See also
 Aerospace Force of the Islamic Revolutionary Guard Corps
 Armed Forces of the Islamic Republic of Iran
 Defense industry of Iran
 Equipment of the Iranian Army
 Fateh-110
 Zelzal-1
 Zelzal-3

References

External link

Weapons of Iran
Hezbollah rocket systems
Ballistic missiles of Iran
Military equipment introduced in the 1990s